Roots music may refer to:
 American folk music
 Americana (music), a style incorporating early blues, country, folk, rhythm and blues, and rock influences
 Folk music
 Rasin, Haitian roots music
 Roots reggae
 Roots revival, a trend which includes young performers popularizing the traditional musical styles of their ancestors
 Roots rock
 World music